This Close to You is the second studio album by American recording artist group Luther, released on March 23, 1977. It is the follow-up to the group's self-titled debut album Luther. Luther Vandross performs the lead vocals on the majority of the album, also as writer and producer. 
This Close to You was the group’s final album, and by 1980 Vandross signed a solo deal with Epic Records, leading to the release of his debut album Never Too Much in 1981. After achieving R&B/pop music success, Vandross bought back the rights to both Luther and This Close to You albums preventing a later re-issue after the record label dropped the group due to low sales.

Track listing

Personnel
Luther Vandross, Anthony Hinton - lead vocals
Diane Sumler - vocals
Wilbur Bascomb, Will Lee - bass
Pablo Rosario - congas
Rick Marotta, Dennis Davis - drums
Michael Pomier - percussion, congas
Fred Gripper - electric piano
Jeff Mironov, Nile Rodgers, Cornell Dupree - guitar
Nathaniel Edward Adderley, Don Grolnick - piano, keyboards
George Young II - soprano saxophone
David A. Friedman - vibraphone, bells
Paul Riser - arrangements
Alfred Brown - string and horn contractor 
David Krevat - executive producer

Singles

References

External links
luthervandross.com-timeline

1977 albums
Luther (group) albums
Luther Vandross albums
Albums produced by Luther Vandross
Albums arranged by Paul Riser
Cotillion Records albums